The San Francisco Fringe Festival, or SF Fringe, is a fringe theater festival produced by the EXIT Theatre in San Francisco. It is one of the oldest fringe festivals in the United States. It takes place over the course of two weeks every September.

The festival was founded in 1992 by several members of BAIT (Bay Area Independent Theatre), a consortium of small theatres in San Francisco and vicinity.   

Performances featured at SF Fringe are chosen by lottery. The 2017 festival featured about 150 performances by more than 35 theater companies, performing in three small theater venues. Non Traditional Fringe Venues (NTFV) have included "bars and restaurants, on buses, park benches and trees".  Many of the shows feature mature themes or nudity.

The conclusion of the festival features additional performances by shows chosen as the "Best of the Fringe".

2019 award winners

2019 Best of Fringe Awards
 AEON by James Sundquist
 Get Uncomfortable Nicia De’Lovely
 HICK: A Love Story, The Romance of Lorena Hickok & Eleanor Roosevelt by Terry Baum &  Lilith Women's Theater
 I Favor My Daddy by Jamie Brickhouse
 The Magic of Ryan Kane by Ryan Kane
  My Will and My Life by Harry Cronin, Page 86 Productions, John Tranchitella
  Why My Unicorn Left Me by Resonance

2019 Tech Awards
 Barbara Holoway Volunteer Award: David Kirby
 Big Tips Award: Glen Micheletti
 Curtis Overacre über Tech Award: Michelle Chesley
 Techie's Choice Award: Fingertips by Fingertips Variety
 Volunteer's Choice Award:  Grief is Horny by Jonathan Euseppi

2018 award winners

2018 Best of Fringe Awards
 Adam and Eve on a Raft by Book of Jones
 ALTARS FOR MY ALTERS Potatoes Mashed Comedy
 Dandy Darkly's All Aboard by Dandy Darkly
 Dangerous When Wet: Booze, Sex, and my Mother by Jamie Brickhouse
 Experts, Assholes, and True Believers by Ronen Sberlo
 Mingalaba by James Sundquist
 My Preferred Pronoun is We by Lyralen Kaye
 The Immaculate Big Bang by Bill Santiago

2018 Sold Out Awards
 Adam and Eve on a Raft by Book of Jones
 ALTARS FOR MY ALTERS Potatoes Mashed Comedy
 Dandy Darkly's All Aboard by Dandy Darkly
 Dangerous When Wet: Booze, Sex, and my Mother by Jamie Brickhouse
 Experts, Assholes, and True Believers by Ronen Sberlo
 Mingalaba by James Sundquist
 Put a Little Shimmer in Your Life by Joan Chaplick
 The Immaculate Big Bang by Bill Santiago
 The Mermaid's Tears by Evelyn Jean Pine
 The Secret Language by Allen Gittelson

2017 award winners

2017 Best of Fringe Award Winners with Encore Performances
  Dandy Darkly's Myth Mouth! by Dandy Darkly
  Expeditious Intent by James Sundquist
  Nigga-Roo by Dazie-Grego Sykes

2017 Best of Fringe Awards
  An Audience With Shurl by Sue Bevan Theatre
  BLACK! by Michael Washington Brown
  Dandy Darkly's Myth Mouth! by Dandy Darkly
  Even If It's Wrong by Todd Pickering
  Expeditious Intent by James Sundquist
  Hitler in the Green Room by K.S. Haddock
  Homeful by Amy Mihyang Ginther
  Keeping Up With the Jorgensons by Jeremy Julian Greco
  Nigga-Roo by Dazie-Grego Sykes
  Tasha by Cat Brooks
  Why Would I Mispronounce My Own Name? by Irma Herrera
  You Fucking Earned It by Naked Empire Bouffon.

2017 Tech Awards
 Barbara Holoway Volunteer Award: Denise Dee
 Big Tips Award: Glen Micheletti
 Curtis Overacre über Tech Award: Tyler Null
 Techie's Choice Award: An Audience With Shurl by Sue Bevan Theatre

2017 SOLD OUT Awards
Given to shows which sold all seats to a performance.
  $wampland by Other Voices and Playwright's Center of SF - 1 award
  Hitler in the Green Room by K.S. Haddock - 3 awards

See also
 Elastic Future
 EXIT Theatre

References

https://www.huffingtonpost.com/entry/snowflakes-may-feel-triggered_us_59b7fce5e4b0883782dec32c

External links
 

Fringe
Fringe festivals in the United States
Festivals established in 1992
1992 establishments in California